Alden is a city in Rice County, Kansas, United States.  As of the 2020 census, the population of the city was 122.

History
For millennia, the land now known as Kansas was inhabited by Native Americans.  In 1803, most of modern Kansas was secured by the United States as part of the Louisiana Purchase.  In 1854, the Kansas Territory was organized, then in 1861 Kansas became the 34th U.S. state.  In 1867, Rice County was founded.

Alden was founded in 1872. It was a station on the Atchison, Topeka and Santa Fe Railway. Alden was named for Alden Speare, a railroad employee. The first post office in Alden was established in 1882.

Geography
Alden is located at  (38.244093, -98.311492).

Demographics

2010 census
As of the census of 2010, there were 148 people, 61 households, and 47 families residing in the city. The racial makeup of the city was 94.6% White, 0.7% Asian, and 4.7% from two or more races. Hispanic or Latino of any race were 1.4% of the population.

There were 61 households, of which 29.5% had children under the age of 18 living with them, 70.5% were married couples living together, 3.3% had a female householder with no husband present, 3.3% had a male householder with no wife present, and 23.0% were non-families. 21.3% of all households were made up of individuals, and 9.8% had someone living alone who was 65 years of age or older. The average household size was 2.43 and the average family size was 2.79.

The median age in the city was 44 years. 22.3% of residents were under the age of 18; 6.2% were between the ages of 18 and 24; 23.7% were from 25 to 44; 28.4% were from 45 to 64; and 19.6% were 65 years of age or older. The gender makeup of the city was 52.0% male and 48.0% female.

2000 census
As of the census of 2000, there were 168 people, 73 households, and 52 families residing in the city. The racial makeup of the city was 99.40% White, and 0.60% from two or more races. Hispanic or Latino of any race were 2.98% of the population.

There were 73 households, out of which 19.2% had children under the age of 18 living with them, 67.1% were married couples living together, 2.7% had a female householder with no husband present, and 27.4% were non-families. 26.0% of all households were made up of individuals, and 16.4% had someone living alone who was 65 years of age or older. The average household size was 2.30 and the average family size was 2.77.

In the city, the population was spread out, with 22.0% under the age of 18, 6.0% from 18 to 24, 25.6% from 25 to 44, 22.6% from 45 to 64, and 23.8% who were 65 years of age or older. The median age was 43 years. For every 100 females, there were 100.0 males. For every 100 females age 18 and over, there were 92.6 males.

The median income for a household in the city was $36,442, and the median income for a family was $36,827. Males had a median income of $26,500 versus $18,333 for females. The per capita income for the city was $21,908. None of the families and 1.1% of the population were living below the poverty line, including no under eighteens and 6.9% of those over 64.

Education
The community is served by Sterling USD 376 public school district.

References

Further reading

External links
 Alden - Directory of Public Officials
 Rice County map, KDOT

Cities in Kansas
Cities in Rice County, Kansas
1872 establishments in Kansas
Populated places established in 1872